The North Carolina Negro Library Association (NCNLA) was a professional organization for North Carolina's black librarians and library workers. It was the first black library association in the United States and the first black chapter in the American Library Association. It was headquartered in Durham, North Carolina at the North Carolina College for Negroes beginning in 1942.

It was founded on April 20–21, 1934, at Shaw University in Raleigh, North Carolina, with Mollie Huston Lee and A. P. Marshall two of the original founders. At the time, black librarians could not join the NCLA because of racial segregation, however white librarians could join NCNLA and some did. NCNLA joined the American Library Association as a chapter on February 1, 1943.

NCNLA published a mimeographed newsletter, The LIBRARIAN, beginning on November 17, 1937. It also published an organizational handbook in 1940 and began publication of LIBRARY SERVICE REVIEW in 1948.

Merge with NCLA
NCNLA began talks of merging with NCLA in 1948 and the first meeting of a joint committee of the NCLA and NCNLA on the merger of the two organizations was held March 11, 1950. The membership of NCNLA were invited guests to an NCLA annual meeting on April 26–27, 1951 and over 85 black librarians attended.

The American Library Association made a decision to only allow one library association chapter per state, and required that any state chapter be integrated. As a result, NCLA agreed to admit black members in 1954—voting 255 yeses to 107 nos. The two associations merged in 1955 after the NCNLA voted in the recommendations of the Committee on Redesignation at their annual meeting on November 5–6, 1954 under the guidance of Constance Hill Marteena.

NCNLA had their last official meeting as an independent group on November 4–5, 1955 in Charlotte, North Carolina.  The NCLA elected their first black president, Dr. Annette Phinazee, in 1975. Dr. Phinazee commented on her presidency,

Conferences

References

Library associations in the United States
Organizations based in North Carolina